Winston Truman McKenzie (born 23 October 1953) is a British political activist and perennial candidate for public office. He is currently a founder and leader of the Unity in Action Party. He has been a member of every major UK political party, and has stood as an independent or minor party candidate on numerous occasions without success.

A British Jamaican, McKenzie worked as a boxer before later running a pub with his brothers; it was closed down after police found many of its customers to possess weapons and drugs.

He was a member of the Labour Party from the 1980s until 2001. The following year he joined the Liberal Democrats, staying with them until 2003; he then remained politically independent for some time before becoming a member of Veritas, going back to standing as an independent, then back to Veritas to unsuccessfully contest their leadership election. In 2006 he joined the Conservative Party, standing to be their London mayoral candidate but failing to be shortlisted, before becoming a political independent again.

In 2009, he tried to establish his own Unity Party, but this failed owing to a lack of financial backing; McKenzie then joined the UK Independence Party. He stood for its leadership in 2010 and was the UKIP candidate in the 2012 Croydon North by-election, where he came third with 5.7% of the vote - his best ever election performance. He served as UKIP's Commonwealth spokesman from 2014 until 9 March 2015, when he was sacked over a series of gaffes.

After an acrimonious departure from UKIP, McKenzie joined the English Democrats in December 2015 and attempted to run for Mayor of London in the 2016 election. That year, he competed on the reality television show Celebrity Big Brother, and was the first contestant to be eliminated, after receiving negative attention for his views on homosexuality. In 2017, he left the English Democrats and founded his own party, Unity in Action.

Once a regular fixture in British politics, standing in up to three elections per year, McKenzie has stood for public office only once since 2018. He blamed an abortive attempt to stand for Mayor of London in 2021 on difficulties he encountered with filling out forms. 

He stood in the  2022 Croydon Mayoral Election as an independent, campaigning on a platform based largely on local economic stimulation and regeneration. He received 1,324 (1.4%) votes, losing to Conservative candidate and former councillor for South Croydon, Jason Perry.

Background
An elder brother of boxer Duke McKenzie and a younger brother of boxer Clinton McKenzie, Winston McKenzie was an amateur middleweight boxer. He also fought professionally as a super-welterweight in a career spanning 1975 to 1982, winning six of his 16 fights, and being knocked out nine times. He contended that after an underprivileged childhood, "boxing was my salvation". At the age of 23, his boxing career suffered a setback after he suffered two detached retinas, although he continued to box for many years.

He later worked as a hairdresser, a rug wholesaler, a letting agent and a garage mechanic. He also ran a pub in Parchmore Road, Thornton Heath with his brothers. When the McKenzies bought the pub, it had "a notorious reputation... as a 'battleground' rife with gangsters and drug pushers until the brothers took over." They opened it as the McKenzie Bros Bar & Grill, but it was threatened with removal of its licence in July 2001 "after being caught several times by police serving alcohol after hours." It closed down in December 2002, after a single police raid resulted in 25 people on the premises being charged with various drugs and firearms offences. The pub was boarded up after the raid, and McKenzie confirmed in January 2003 that it would not be reopening. The building has been demolished. In 2005 he unsuccessfully auditioned for The X Factor.

Political career

Labour, Lib Dems and Independent
McKenzie joined the Labour Party in the 1980s. In 2002 he joined the Liberal Democrats and, in February 2003, was quoted in the press as saying "I'm still very involved with the Liberal Democrats and have every intention of standing for MP in the next election." Seven months later he had left the Lib Dems.

He stood in the September 2003 Brent East by-election as an independent candidate on a slogan of "The black voice for Great Britain". He pledged to "shut all gates of entry to immigrants and asylum seekers" (and ask the US to take on Britain's immigrants in exchange for Britain's support in the Iraq War), and to increase sports facilities for young people. He also opposed university tuition fees on the grounds that young people should be able "to enjoy the privileges of childhood." He polled 197 votes (0.94%), coming seventh out of 16 candidates.

Veritas, Independent and Veritas again
McKenzie joined the newly formed Veritas party in 2005, calling for "a blanket ban on immigration and asylum for one year", and becoming its principal spokesman on sport. In the 2005 general election he stood for Veritas in Croydon North, coming seventh of nine candidates with 324 votes (0.7%). After the election he denounced party leader Robert Kilroy-Silk, whom he publicly blamed for his defeat, his lost deposit and other financial losses as a result of his campaign. He resigned from Veritas two weeks after the 2005 election (and three months after joining). He rejoined Veritas when Kilroy-Silk stepped down as leader, so that he could stand for leader of the party. He came third out of three candidates, polling 168 votes (14.4%).

In between his two short memberships of Veritas, he stood on 16 June 2005 Fieldway by-election to Croydon Council as an independent. He came fourth of five candidates, polling 47 votes (2.47%), only surpassing the votes received by the Official Monster Raving Loony Party candidate.

Conservative and Independent - 2008 London mayoral candidacy
After the local press reported that his 2004 "inaugural Croydon youth games ended in farce [in] October after many events were cancelled at short notice", McKenzie accused the local Conservative council of being "racist" in failing to support the endeavour. However, in November 2006 he joined the Conservative Party and announced his intention to be the next Mayor of London. He stood in 2007 for the Conservative Party's nomination, but failed to attract enough support to make the shortlist. He then left the Conservative Party by the end of the year and stood in the 2008 mayoral election as an independent candidate, under the slogans "I float like a butterfly and sting like a bee; I've got the policies they can't see" and "They said it couldn't be done". He came last of the 10 candidates, polling 5,389 votes (0.22%).

Unity Party
McKenzie founded the Unity Party in March 2009, and announced he would be the Unity Party candidate for Croydon Central at the next UK general election. In October 2009, McKenzie reported that Unity had folded as a party because of the withdrawal of its main financial backer.

UK Independence Party

2009–10: leadership elections, general election
McKenzie joined the United Kingdom Independence Party (UKIP) in September 2009, and immediately announced he was a candidate to succeed Nigel Farage in its leadership election. However, McKenzie was barred from standing because he was still the leader of the Unity Party. In February 2010 he was adopted as UKIP's candidate for Tottenham. In the 2010 general election he came sixth of 10 candidates in Tottenham, polling 466 votes (1.1%).

McKenzie sought to stand again for leader of UKIP in September 2010, after Lord Pearson of Rannoch resigned. He came last of the four candidates, with 530 votes cast (5.3%).

2011–12: London Mayoral, Assembly elections, Croydon North by-election
McKenzie confirmed in May 2011 that he was again hoping to be Mayor of London, this time under the banner of UKIP. He told UKIP paper The Voice: "The rumours are true. I am definitely looking to be nominated as a candidate." There were five other candidates for the UKIP nomination: David Coburn, Michael Corby, Mick McGough, Paul Oakley and Lawrence Webb. In a ballot of members in August 2011, McKenzie came joint third with McGough, both on 7.4%, behind winner Webb, who had 42%, and David Coburn on 29%.

In January 2012, UKIP announced that it had selected McKenzie as candidate for the Croydon and Sutton seat in the 2012 elections to the Greater London Assembly. At the pre-election hustings in Croydon, a local newspaper reported that "he provided the audience with some welcome, but not always intentional, comic relief". When the issue of the building of a new waste incinerator was raised he announced "To be honest, ref, I'm not too hot on this issue", and the paper noted that he did not have "the first clue about the incinerator debate" and had a "lack of policies". He also bizarrely stated: "A couple of people in the audience to-night, I can see your faces. I owe you money.... You know where to find me." In the election he polled 10,757 votes (6.99%) across the boroughs of Croydon and Sutton, an increase of 1.6% on the UKIP vote in 2008, coming fourth of five candidates.

In October 2012 he was announced as the UKIP candidate for the Croydon North by-election. On 27 November 2012, McKenzie gave two interviews to the Croydon Advertiser and the London Metro which were repeated in the local and national press. He was reported to have commented that adoption by same-sex couples constitutes "child abuse", and asked the interviewer, 
"If you couldn't look after your child and you had to put them up for adoption, would you honestly want your child to be adopted by a gay couple? Would you seriously want that or a heterosexual family? Which would be more healthy for the child? A caring loving home is a heterosexual or single family. I don't believe [a same-sex couple] is healthy for a child." 
The comments were condemned by Ben Summerskill, Chief Executive of Stonewall, as "inflammatory", while UKIP distanced itself from the comments. The Croydon Advertiser interview also described as "a bizarre rant" McKenzie's related comments about people who "pretend" to be gay: 
"Some people take on being gay as a sort of fashion. Celebrities come out to become more well known, it gets attention. It's a fact of life that some people actually are gay. They are what they are. They can't help it but the other bunch take on being gay as a fashion and push it because they have nothing better to do with their lives. They let the side down." 
The subsequent Metro interview, held to clarify McKenzie's earlier remarks, quoted him as elaborating: "To say to a child, 'I am having you adopted by two men who kiss regularly but don't worry about it' – that is abuse. It is a violation of a child’s human rights because that child has no opportunity to grow up under normal circumstances."

In the Croydon North by-election, McKenzie came third with 5.7% of the vote, beating the Liberal Democrats and the Green Party. He also retained his deposit for the first time in his political career.

2013–14: local election, local difficulties
During campaigning for the 2014 local and European elections, a UKIP event organised in Croydon was picketed by protestors angry at Nigel Farage's recent comments on Romanian immigrants and bearing a placard reading "We Are Romanians". McKenzie said that the protesters had "diminished the meaning of racism.... They've taken away the meaning of racism, which is a very potent subject." A steel band had been booked to play at the event but walked out, in full view of TV news camera crews, once they learned that it was a UKIP event. Farage had been due to attend but did not arrive, and McKenzie informed reporters that:
"It's not a case of being scared, it's a case of being a responsible family man and it is like being a boxer going into the ring. There are certain situations that you do not go into. If he hasn't turned up then he's a very sensible man. Croydon which used to be the place to shop has now become a dump. How can an international leader turn up somewhere he feels unsafe? Croydon has deteriorated over successive Labour and Tory governments and now we have a coalition Croydon has descended into depravity"
before adding that "Croydon is unsafe and a dump." He was not elected to Croydon Council, polling 480 votes, and coming ninth of 14 candidates. The incident led to McKenzie earning the local sobriquet, "Chump from the Dump".

McKenzie lost the confidence of his local UKIP branch, amid claims he and his partner Marianne Bowness mishandled thousands of pounds of branch funds, failing to account for the spending or to keep adequate receipts. He was suspended as branch chairman, and later replaced. Members signed motions of no confidence in McKenzie, and called an Extraordinary General Meeting to remove him.

2015: general election, acrimonious departure from UKIP
McKenzie was the UKIP candidate for Croydon North in the 2015 general election. He had been Chairman of the Lambeth and Croydon North branch of UKIP, but was suspended on 19 December 2014 after "months of infighting" and accusations that he had misappropriated donations.

UKIP sacked McKenzie from his position as Commonwealth spokesman for the party in March 2015, although he retained his position as prospective candidate for Croydon North. In the 2015 general election he came third, again beating the Liberal Democrats and the Green Party, and again retaining his deposit with 5.4% of the vote.

In November 2015, McKenzie said on ITV News that he had been overlooked for the London elections as a mayoral or Greater London Assembly candidate, and claimed this was owing to racism amongst senior UKIP officials. He said he was resigning from the party, and he cast his UKIP badge onto the table. He declared he would stand for London Mayor as an independent candidate.

English Democrats
McKenzie joined the English Democrats in December 2015.

2016 abortive Mayoral bid: paperwork problems and financial controversy
Almost immediately after joining the English Democrats, McKenzie was selected as the party's candidate for the 2016 London mayoral election, at a national council meeting held in Bradford. A party statement declared McKenzie to be "the most influential Black English political figure today".

However, his nomination papers for the mayoral election were not completed properly before the close of nominations, so he was ineligible to stand in that election. Election administrators London Elects blamed McKenzie for leaving his paperwork to the last minute, saying "The English Democrats' prospective candidate for London Mayor, Winston McKenzie, met with London Elects for the first time at 13.45 on March 31, 2016. At that time, the paperwork was incomplete. Mr. McKenzie was given the opportunity to resolve matters by the 4pm legal deadline."

It later emerged that there was also some controversy over the disappearance of campaign funds, after McKenzie had fundraised for a target £60,000 Mayoral campaign, including the £20,000 cost of a deposit. Refuting allegations of malfeasance from Inside Croydon, McKenzie insisted: “£20,000 was paid in cash at City Hall”, for the London election. It was subsequently confirmed, both by election administrators, and by the Leader of the English Democrats who accompanied McKenzie as the paperwork was submitted, that no money had been ever been paid. Inside Croydon asked:

"What appears to have happened, whether through accident or design, is that Winston McKenzie walked away from City Hall that day with several thousand pounds in money which had been donated in good faith for the purpose of his standing in the Mayoral elections. What remains unexplained is what efforts, if any, McKenzie has made in the past six months to return any of that money to his various donors and supporters after he was unable to use it for the purpose intended."

As of December 2016, the fate of the missing money was still unknown.

Witney by-election and English Democrats leadership bid
On 8 April 2016 it was confirmed that McKenzie would be standing in a borough council by-election in Croydon to be held on the same day as the mayoral election. In October he stood in the by-election in the Oxfordshire seat of Witney, left vacant by the resignation of David Cameron. He came 12th of 14 candidates, with 52 votes, less than half the votes received by the Official Monster Raving Loony Party candidate.

In December 2016, less than a year after joining the English Democrats, McKenzie announced that he was standing for the party's leadership, seeking to unseat its long-serving leader Robin Tilbrook. Tilbrook responded that he was "unconcerned" by the challenge. It later emerged that the English Democrats did not as yet have a procedure for challenging a sitting leader, and a review then underway would not provide such a procedure until March 2017 at the earliest. McKenzie chose to resign from the English Democrats in early 2017 instead.

Unity in Action
In 2017 McKenzie registered the Unity in Action Party with the Electoral Commission, declaring himself as Leader, and his partner, Marianne Bowness, as Treasurer. He and Bowness stood for Croydon Council in the 2018 Croydon London Borough Council election, but they were not elected, respectively coming in last and second-last of 14 candidates in his council ward, each polling 59 votes (0.46%) and 63 votes (0.49%).

Difficulties filling out forms
McKenzie announced his intention to stand as Unity in Action's candidate for Mayor of London in the 2021 London mayoral election, which had been postponed from 2020 due to the COVID-19 pandemic. However, McKenzie later explained that administrative difficulties prevented him from standing, including routine re-registration with the Electoral Commission, which was "Not as easy as we imagined!", as a team of four volunteers for his party "found they were unable to even log-in with their own email details, or pass codes." After McKenzie's party grappled for four and a half months to log into the website used by every registered political party in the UK, the Commission declined their application, flagging 8 issues with Unity in Action's constitution. Further attempts to amend the party constitution ran out of time before the election registration deadline. McKenzie lamented: "All Party Candidates had to be stood down. All deposits returned. Sponsorship cancelled!"

Celebrity Big Brother
In January 2016, McKenzie became a contestant on the Channel 5 reality television show Celebrity Big Brother., expressing the view that doing so was a "good opportunity to get exposure" for his mayoral candidacy. McKenzie stated that if there was to be a gay person in the house, "I guess I'll just have to stand with my back against a brick wall all the time." Upon making these comments, McKenzie was booed by the audience. Within two days, the regulator Ofcom received over 300 complaints about his comments. McKenzie was however defended by the spokesperson for the English Democrats, Steve Uncles, who compared the gay community to Nazis "when it comes to freedom of speech" and stated that McKenzie's viewpoint was being unfairly demonised given that – in his view – any Muslim contestants on Celebrity Big Brother would try to throw gay men off buildings.

During his time in the house, he reiterated his previous comments on child adoption by LGBT couples to Angie Bowie (the bisexual ex-wife of David Bowie), referring to such adoption as "child abuse", a view which Bowie clearly abhorred. Housemates and viewers of the programme considered his views towards homosexuality as wrong and also "disgusting". McKenzie was evicted via housemates' votes 13/14 on 8 January. During an interview with Emma Willis upon his eviction, she interrogated him on his controversial time in the house he referred to his time in the CBB house, saying that "I'm a boxer. Amateur professional. I thought I knew everything. But when I walked into the house and heard other people’s stories, anxieties, what they've been through, I realised you don't know everything. There are people out there who really give it their all.... It's such a revelation for me."

Personal life
Asked to name his proudest achievements, McKenzie said, "Of all the things in life that one could possibly achieve, I guess I am proud of the honour, dignity and self-respect that I have earned throughout the years through boxing, politics and the love of my former wife, Cheryl."

McKenzie's long-term partner is Marianne Bowness, formerly the wife of Peter [later Lord] Bowness. In 2015, McKenzie recalled that they first met when she was the Mayoress of Croydon (in 1979-80), and her husband gave an honour to the McKenzie brothers for their work in boxing. Several years later, after the breakup of her marriage, she volunteered to manage the opening of his pub, the McKenzie Bros Bar and Grill, whilst McKenzie offered to help her lose weight, from 18 stone to 11 stone.

In an interview with Chat Politics, McKenzie likened UKIP leader Nigel Farage to Jesus Christ and non-stick Teflon, saying that "Jesus was one man, we're his army. Farage is one man, and we're his army and that's what it's all about," adding that "Farage is like Teflon – he can do no wrong. Everywhere he goes, it doesn't matter what he says or does – he gets away with it."

Electoral record

{| class="wikitable" 
|-
! colspan="12" | Summary of 5 May 2016 Mayor of London election results
|-
!|| Name || Party || 1st Preference Votes || % || 2nd Preference Votes || % || Final || %
|-
|  || Sadiq Khan || Labour || 1,148,716 || 44.2 (+3.9) || 388,090 || 17.5 || 1,536,806 || 56.9 (+8.4)
|-
|  || Zac Goldsmith || Conservative || 909,755 || 35.0 (-9.0) || 250,214 || 11.3 || 1,159,969 || 43.0 (-8.5)
|-
|  || Siân Berry || Green || 150,673 || 5.8 (+1.3) || 468,318 || 21.2 || N/A ||
|-
|  || Caroline Pidgeon || Liberal Democrat || 120,005 || 4.6 (+0.4) || 335,931 || 15.2 || N/A ||
|-  
|  || Peter Whittle || UKIP || 94,373 || 3.6 (+1.6) || 223,253 || 10.1 || N/A ||
|-
|  || Sophie Walker || Women's Equality Party || 53,055 || 2.0 (-) || 198,720 || 9.0 || N/A ||
|-
|  || George Galloway || Respect || 37,007 || 1.4 (-) || 117,080 || 5.3 || N/A ||
|-
|  || Paul Golding || Britain First || 31,372 || 1.2 (-) || 73,883 || 3.3 || N/A ||
|-
|  || Lee Harris || CISTA || 20,537 || 0.8 (-) || 67,495 || 3.1 || N/A ||
|-
|  || David Furness || BNP || 13,325 || 0.5 (-) || 36,168 || 1.6 || N/A ||
|-
|  || Prince Zylinski || Independent || 13,202 || 0.5 (-) || 24,646 || 1.1 || N/A ||
|-
|  || Ankit Love || One Love || 4,941 || 0.2 (-) || 28,920 || 1.3 || N/A ||
|-
|  || Winston T. McKenzie || English Democrats || Disqualified from ballot paper || N/A || N/A || N/A || N/A ||

References

External links
McKenzie 4 Mayor 2008 website
Campaign video of McKenzie as a UKIP candidate, 2010

1953 births
Living people
Conservative Party (UK) politicians
English Democrats politicians
Independent British political candidates
Jamaican emigrants to the United Kingdom
Liberal Democrats (UK) politicians
English male boxers
UK Independence Party parliamentary candidates
Veritas (political party) politicians
British Eurosceptics
Leaders of political parties in the United Kingdom